Casco is a census-designated place (CDP) in the town of Casco in Cumberland County, Maine, United States. The population of the CDP was 587 at the 2010 census. It is part of the Portland–South Portland–Biddeford, Maine Metropolitan Statistical Area.

Geography

It is located along Maine State Route 121 near the northern corner of the town of Casco, at the outlet of Pleasant Lake.

Demographics

References

Census-designated places in Maine
Portland metropolitan area, Maine
Census-designated places in Cumberland County, Maine